Hickman v Kent or Romney Marsh Sheep-Breeders’ Association [1915] 1 Ch 881 is a UK company law case, concerning the proper interpretation of a company's articles, and whether a company member could be bound by its terms.

Facts
Article 49 said disputes between the association and a member should go to arbitration, before court. Mr Hickman complained about refusal to register his sheep in the published flock book and was under threat of being expelled. He started proceedings in the High Court and the association sought an injunction.

Judgment
Astbury J held that the articles prevented Mr Hickman: there was a contract. He was bound. The predecessor to the Companies Act 2006 section 33 creates a contract, which affects members in their capacity as members, though not in a special or personal capacity (e.g. as director). As a member, Mr Hickman was bound to comply with the company procedure for arbitrating disputes and could not resort to court.

See also

UK company law

Notes

References

United Kingdom company case law
High Court of Justice cases
1915 in case law
1915 in British law
Sheep farming in the United Kingdom